Mark Owens is an American politician and farmer serving as a member of the Oregon House of Representatives from the 60th district. He was appointed on January 21, 2020 to replace Lynn Findley.

Background 
Owens was raised in Boring, Oregon. He previously served as a Harney County Commissioner and as chair of the Crane School Board. Owens was appointed to the Oregon House of Representatives by the Grant County Commission in January 2020, succeeding Lynn Findley.

References 

Living people
County commissioners in Oregon
Republican Party members of the Oregon House of Representatives
School board members in Oregon
Year of birth missing (living people)
People from Harney County, Oregon
People from Boring, Oregon